91.7 Magik FM (DWCN 91.7 MHz) is an FM station owned and operated by Century Broadcasting Network. Its studios and transmitter are located along College Ave., Tuguegarao.

References

External links
Magik FM Tuguegarao FB Page

Radio stations in Cagayan